The Lady in the Van is the original soundtrack album for the 2015 film of the same name. Composed by George Fenton, it was released through Sony Classical Records, a subsidiary of Sony Music Entertainment that specialises in classical music and compositions.

Track listing
All of the music not otherwise indicated was composed by George Fenton.

References

2015 classical albums
2015 soundtrack albums
Sony Classical Records soundtracks
Comedy film soundtracks
Drama film soundtracks